NGC 3598 is a lenticular galaxy located in the constellation Leo. It was discovered by the astronomer Albert Marth on March 4, 1865.

See also 
 List of galaxies
 List of largest galaxies
 List of nearest galaxies

References

External links 
 

Leo (constellation)
3598
Lenticular galaxies
034306